Toda la Vida y Otros Grandes Exitos is a compilation album, by Mexican iconic pop singer Emmanuel. It was released in 1986. The title comes from the hit song, "Toda la Vida which reached #1 on the Hot Latin Tracks chart. The album reached #1 on the Latin Pop Albums chart for 4 weeks.

Track listing
 "Toda la Vida"
 "Hay Que Arrimar el Alma"
 " El Año Que Vendra... Querido Amigo"
 "Mucho Señora"
 "Esa Triste Guitarra"
 "Estoy Loco"
 "María Del Angel"
 "Pertenezco A Tí"
 "Sola"
 "Detenedla Ya"
 "Entre Cuatro Paredes"

References

1986 compilation albums
Emmanuel (singer) compilation albums